Psychonauts, also known as The Psychonauts, are a British music duo. They consist of Pablo Clement and Paul Mogg. The two met in Somerset, UK, while "digging through crates at the local record store". Clement is also a member of James Lavelle's Unkle project.

Career
In 1998, Psychonauts released a mix album, Time Machine, on Mo' Wax. In 2015, Fact placed it at number 35 on the "50 Best Trip-Hop Albums of All Time" list.

In 2003, the duo released their first studio album, Songs for Creatures, on International DeeJay Gigolo Records. John Bush of AllMusic gave the album 4 out of 5 stars, calling it "one of the best records to appear from a former Mo' Wax act in several years." Neesh Asghar of The Guardian described it as "a gorgeous record showcasing cinematic soundscapes and seductive ethereal ambience alongside pastoral folk-pop songs and electro disco." The album was re-released in 2010. In a review of the album's reissue, Matthew Bennett of Clash called it "a complete dance album that's rarely been surpassed in the last six years."

Discography

Studio albums
 Songs for Creatures (2003, International DeeJay Gigolo Records)

Mix albums
 Time Machine (1998, Mo' Wax)

Singles
 "Hot Blood / Invading Space (Outer Descent)" (1999, Mo' Wax)
 "Fear Is Real / Hips for Scotland" (2003, International DeeJay Gigolo Records)
 "World Keeps Turning" (2004, International DeeJay Gigolo Records)
 "Take Control" (2010, International DeeJay Gigolo Records)

References

External links
 
 

British electronic music duos
Trip hop groups